Hormersdorf is a former municipality in the district Erzgebirgskreis, in Saxony, Germany. Since 1 January 2013, it is part of the town Zwönitz.

Dialect clock

In Hormersdorf a "" (Ziffer clock) was installed that displays the time of day in the local Erzgebirgisch dialect which uses the word "Ziffer" for units of five minute intervals.

The image of the clock at the left shows "" in the dialect meaning 01:10 (literally "two Ziffers of the second hour", a Ziffer being five minutes, the second hour being 01:00 to 02:00 or 13:00 to 14:00 in daytime).
The left-hand wheel has twelve cogs, each showing a five minute interval (a Ziffer), from bottom to top:
üm = at or exactly;
ä Ziffer = one Ziffer or five minutes;
zwee Ziffern = two Ziffer or ten minutes;
värtel = quarter of an hour or fifteen minutes;
vier Ziffern = four Ziffer or twenty minutes;
fünf Ziffern = five Ziffer or twenty-five minutes;
The right-hand wheel also has twelve cogs, each showing a single hour, from bottom to top:
 zwilfe = twelve (or "of the twelfth hour");
 äns = one (or "of the first hour");
 zwee'e = two (or "of the second hour");
 dreie = three;
 viere = four;
 fünfe = five;

References

External links

Former municipalities in Saxony